The 2007 Bullit World Darts Trophy was the sixth and last edition of the World Darts Trophy, a professional darts tournament held at the De Vechtsebanen in Utrecht, the Netherlands, run by the British Darts Organisation and the World Darts Federation.

It had a playing format comparable with both World Championships (BDO and PDC) and features the majority of top ranked players from both organisations. The event featured the top 12 ranked players from the PDC and BDO, seven world champions (including both incumbents) and 23 world title winners – making it possibly the strongest field assembled since the split in 1992/93. 

Raymond van Barneveld, the PDC World Champion,  was beaten in the first round by fellow countryman Jelle Klaasen. The BDO World Champion Martin Adams fell at the quarter-final stage to Andy Hamilton. The final featured Gary Anderson against Phil Taylor. Taylor wasn't able to successfully defend his title despite hitting 17 maximum 180s in the final. Both players averaged over 100 in an excellent final – played over the same 13 set format as the BDO & PDC World Finals. Anderson captured his second major title – adding to his International Darts League success back in May.

Prize fund
2007 prize money
Winner €45,000
Runner-up €22,500
Semi finalists €11,250
Quarter finalists €6,000
Last 16 €3,000
First round losers €2,000
Nine dart finish: Alfa Romeo Brera 2.4 JTDM 20V worth €50,000 (not won)
Highest check-out €1,000
Total €221,000

Qualified players 
The players in bold automatically qualify for the main stage and are seeded. The players in regular text automatically qualify for the main round but are not seed. The players in italics must go through the qualifiers:

BDO / WDF 
World Darts Trophy Merit Table
1 to 8 on WDT Merit Table can be told based on seedings.
 Gary Anderson
 Mark Webster
 Martin Adams
 Darryl Fitton
 Simon Whitlock
 Scott Waites
 Tony O'Shea
 Remco van Eijden

9 to 12 on WDT Merit Table can be told based on rest of the automatic qualifiers.
Exact order of which players are 9 to 12 is unknown.
 Niels de Ruiter
 Mike Veitch
 John Walton
 Co Stompé

Likely BDO / WDF qualifiers or wildcards
  Craig Pullen
  Dietmar Burger
  Edwin Max
  Gary Robson
  Jarkko Komula
  Mario Robbe
  Mark Barilli
  Martin Atkins
  Michael Rosenauer
  Paul Hanvidge
  Phill Nixon
  Robert Grant
  Shaun Greatbatch
  Steve Duke
  Shane Tichowitsch
  Steve West

Professional Darts Corporation
PDC Order of Merit
  Phil Taylor
  Raymond van Barneveld
  Colin Lloyd
  Peter Manley
  Terry Jenkins
  Dennis Priestley
  Adrian Lewis
  John Part
  Roland Scholten
  Andy Hamilton
  James Wade
  Wayne Mardle
  Barrie Bates
  Ronnie Baxter
  Kevin Painter
  Andy Jenkins

PDC qualifiers
  Mark Walsh
  Denis Ovens
  Andy Smith
  Wayne Atwood
  Bob Anderson
  Peter Allen
  Alan Caves
  Gary Spedding

Wildcards
  Mervyn King
  Michael van Gerwen
  Vincent van der Voort
  Jelle Klaasen

Qualifying 
The top 12 players from the PDC Order of Merit and the top 12 BDO / WDF Players from the World Darts Trophy Merit Table automatically qualified for the event. Following controversy (see IDL 2007) regarding the number of players promised an invitation, a qualifying competition was held to fill the other eight places in the first round. Seven PDC players progressed to the first round including Dutchmen Michael van Gerwen, Jelle Klaasen and Vincent van der Voort. The other four PDC players were Denis Ovens, Kevin Painter, Mervyn King and Wayne Atwood. The only BDO player who made it through was Shaun Greatbatch.

First preliminary round (Best of 5 sets)

 Barrie Bates withdrew due to broken foot.

Second preliminary round (Best of 5 sets)

Tournament Proper

Television coverage 
The tournament was broadcast by SBS6 in the Netherlands, but was not shown in the UK. An internet feed from SBS was available - however this may be restricted to the Netherlands only due to contractual restrictions.

References

External links
2007 results Darts Database.
2007 results Darts Mad.
2007 results Master Caller.

World Darts Trophy
World Darts Trophy
2007 in Dutch sport